WWEO may refer to:

 WWEO-LP, a low-power radio station (103.9 FM) licensed to serve DeFuniak Springs, Florida, United States
 WWEO-CD, a low-power television station (channel 24) licensed to serve DeFuniak Springs, Florida